Spacca is an Italian surname. Notable people with the surname include:

Ascensidonio Spacca ( 1557–1646), Italian painter
Gian Mario Spacca (born 1953), Italian politician 
Maria Enrica Spacca (born 1986), Italian sprinter

Italian-language surnames